Trudeau is a 2002 television miniseries and biography dramatizing the life of former Canadian Prime Minister Pierre Elliott Trudeau. It aired on CBC Television on Sunday and Monday evenings and was written by Wayne Grigsby and directed by Jerry Ciccoritti.

The miniseries was one of the highest-rated Canadian television programs of the year, resulting in 8 wins and 3 nominations. Two of the wins were from Directors Guild of Canada; one being the DGC Craft Award, as Jerry Ciccoritti won Outstanding Achievement in Direction and Dean Soltys won Outstanding Achievement in Picture Editing and the other being the DGC Team Award. As well, it won several Gemini Awards including Best Actor, Best Writing and Best Direction. Colm Feore also won Monte-Carlo TV Festival's Best Performance by an Actor. "With all its sham, drudgery and broken dreams, Trudeau is a beautiful show – the best Canadian political teleplay since Denys Arcand's Duplessis 25 years ago, and maybe the best ever."

The miniseries follows Pierre Trudeau through the major events of his political mandates up to the patriation of the Canadian Constitution. A few of the major characters in the film (notably "Greenbaum" and "Duncan") are fictional, or composite characters.

It was filmed in various locations in Canada, but mainly in Halifax, Nova Scotia and at Parliament Hill in Ottawa. Distributed in both official languages English and French, the two episodes first aired on 31 March and 1 April 2002.

As background research, writer Wayne Grigsby spoke to numerous people who had known Trudeau, but the Trudeau family did not reply to the requests by the CBC.

A prequel, Trudeau II: Maverick in the Making, came out in 2005, examining Trudeau's early life. This $8-million, four-hour CBC production was originally designed as a "double shoot," to be filmed in both French and English versions; however, it ended up being made in English only – even though most of the actors, including lead Stéphane Demers, are Québécois. (Demers inherits the role from Colm Feore, who was tied up playing the villain in The Chronicles of Riddick.)

Cast
Trudeau features Colm Feore in the title role. The cast includes Polly Shannon as Margaret Sinclair Trudeau, R.H. Thomson as Mitchell Sharp, Eric Peterson as T.C. (Tommy) Douglas, John Neville as the British high commissioner, Don McKellar as a communications consultant, Aidan Devine as a reporter, and Patrick McKenna as Trudeau's executive assistant.

 Colm Feore – Pierre Elliott Trudeau
 Polly Shannon – Margaret Trudeau
 Patrick McKenna – Duncan
 Don McKellar – Greenbaum
 Peter Outerbridge – Jim Coutts
 Raymond Cloutier – Gérard Pelletier
 Raymond Bouchard – Jean Marchand
 Luc Proulx – René Lévesque
 R. H. Thomson – Mitchell Sharp
 Guy Richer – Jean Chrétien
 Jean Marchand1 – Marc Lalonde
 Geraint Wyn Davies – Bill Davis
 Eric Peterson – Tommy Douglas
 Robert Bockstael – Roy McMurtry
 Ron White – James Sinclair
 Sara Botsford – Kathleen Sinclair
 Michael Copeman – Robert Stanfield
 Brian Heighton – Brian Peckford
 Gary Levert – Roy Romanow
 Jean-Guy Moreau – Jean Drapeau
 Stephen Morgan – Bryce Mackasey
 William Parsons – Lester B. Pearson
 Hugh Thompson – Ron Basford
 Karl Pruner – John Turner
 David McIlwraith – Peter Lougheed

Archival footage of Joe Clark, Knowlton Nash and Queen Elizabeth II is used in the film. Cynthia Dale and Peter Mansbridge also have small roles; Mansbridge plays himself.

Accuracy
In several interviews at the time of the premiere, actual Trudeau PMO bureaucrats commented on the general accuracy of the film.  However, there is one major exception. Most characters in the film refer to Trudeau as "Mr. Prime Minister." This is improper Canadian government protocol; the prime minister is simply referred to as "Prime Minister", although it is not uncommon for the Prime Minister to be addressed by the former as well as the latter. It is notable that actor R. H. Thomson refused to use the scripted address and ad-libbed instead.

Notes
 1 This is an actor, who should not be confused with the character of the same name listed earlier.

References

External links

2002 Canadian television series debuts
Canadian biographical films
Films set in Canada
CBC Television original films
Canadian political drama television series
English-language Canadian films
2000s Canadian television miniseries
Biographical films about prime ministers
Canadian political drama films
Cultural depictions of Pierre Trudeau
Films directed by Jerry Ciccoritti
Television series about prime ministers
French-language Canadian films
Canadian drama television films